Eyüp Öncü (1906 – 1983) was a Turkish equestrian. He competed in two events at the 1948 Summer Olympics.

References

External links
 

1906 births
1983 deaths
Turkish male equestrians
Olympic equestrians of Turkey
Equestrians at the 1948 Summer Olympics
Sportspeople from Van, Turkey